Shade is the fifth studio album by Murray Head. It was released in October 1982.

In 1996, it was reissued by Sony Records with three bonus tracks.

Track listing
All songs composed by Murray Head unless noted.
"Peace of Mind" - 3:22
"Corporation Corridors" - 3:46
"All We Can Do Is Hold On" (Joe Sample) - 3:42
"Not Your Problem" - 3:41
"Joey's on Fire" (Murray Head, Peter Veitch) - 4:49
"Maman" - 4:01
"Grace" - 3:56
"Dragonfly" - 3:03
"Shades of the Prison House" - 5:55

1996 reissue
"Peace of Mind" - 3:22
"Corporation Corridors" - 3:46
"All We Can Do Is Hold On" - 3:42
"Not Your Problem" - 3:41
"Joey's on Fire" (Head, Veitch) - 4:49
"Maman" - 4:01
"Grace" - 3:56
"Dragonfly" - 3:03
"Mario"
"All the Way"
"When You're In Love"
"Shades of the Prison House" - 5:55

Charts

Certifications

Personnel
Murray Head - vocals
Phil Palmer - guitar
Alan Spenner - bass guitar
Peter Veitch - keyboards
Gerry Conway - drums
Geoffrey Richardson - viola

External links
Shade at the official Murray Head site.
Shade at the unofficial Murray Head site.

References 

Murray Head albums
1982 albums
Albums produced by Steve Nye
Virgin Records albums